Ricardo Thomas, also known as Rick Rock, is an American record producer originally from Montgomery, Alabama and based in Fairfield, California. He is a founding member of the former rap group Cosmic Slop Shop and the Federation with fellow rapper Doonie Baby, and is regarded as a pioneer of the hip-hop subgenre Hyphy.

Late 1990s 
Rick Rock began to make a name for himself in 1996 when well known Vallejo Producer Mike Mosley invited him to come to the studio to meet E-40. E-40 had originally planned on using a beat produced by Mike Mosley, however due to Mosley's tardiness, Rick Rock used that time as an opportunity to showcase his talents. He went on to produce two tracks featured on E-40's Tha Hall of Game including the song "Record Haters" a diss track directed to NYC rapper AZ and basketball player Rasheed Wallace. E-40 then introduced Rick Rock to 2pac where he and Mike Mosley co-produced two additional tracks "Tradin War Stories" and "Ain't Hard to Find" from the album All Eyez on Me. Around that time Rick Rock also contributed heavily to fellow bay area artist Spice 1's Immortalized album.

Early 2000s 
Rick Rock's popularity grew in the early 2000s after Jay-Z released the hit single "Change the Game". From there, Rick Rock went on to produce "Can't Deny It" for Fabolous, and "I Don't Do Much" by Beanie Sigel. In 2002 Rick Rock reunited with Vallejo producer Mike Mosely and produced the songs "Godzilla" featuring E-40 and Pizzo and "The Sickness" by Federation. Both songs were featured on Mike Mosely's compilation album Major Work The Soundtrack. In Spring of 2002, Rick Rock produced "Automatic" featuring Fabolous, which became the lead single for E-40's album Grit & Grind. In 2003 Rick Rock gained more commercial success working with New York-based artists, producing hits "Make It Clap" for Busta Rhymes "If I Could Go" for Angie Martinez and "Breathe, Stretch, Shake" for Mase. Following his commercial success, Rick Rock became a sought after producer on the West Coast producing underground tracks like Keak Da Sneak's "T-Shirt, Blue Jeans, & Nike's", "Back it Up" by Ras Kass, "Whip Appeal" by Bambino Brown and producing over half of the songs featured on B-Legit's fourth album Hard 2 B-Legit. In 2003 Rick Rock founded his own label Southwest Federation and signed the Federation featuring fellow Cosmic Slop Shop alumn, Doonie Baby and additional rappers San Diego Native Battle Locco and Harlem native El Dorado Red. El Dorado Red is the only rapper other than the Federation to release an album on Rick Rock's label with the release of East Side Rydah Vol. 1.

Discography

Studio albums

Albums with Rick Rock production 

1996: All Eyez on Me by Tupac Shakur
1996: Tha Hall of Game by E-40
1996: Seasoned Veteran by Richie Rich
1997: Unpredictable by Mystikal
1998: The Element of Surprise by E-40
1998: Fearless by Marvaless
1999: Immortalized by Spice 1
2000: The Dynasty: Roc La Familia by Jay-Z
2000: Loyalty and Betrayal by E-40
2000: Restless by Xzibit
2001: The Reason by Beanie Sigel
2001: Supernova by Lisa "Left Eye" Lopes
2001: Ghetto Fabolous by Fabolous
2001: Thug Lord: The New Testament by Yukmouth
2002: Blood Brothers by Kastro & E.D.I. of Outlawz
2002: Ghetto Heisman by WC
2002: If I Could Go! by Angie Martinez feat Sacario & Lil Mo
2002: Grit & Grind by E-40
2002: Animal House by Angie Martinez
2002: Hard 2 B-Legit by B-Legit
2002: West Coast Mafia by C-Bo
2002: It Ain't Safe No More by Busta Rhymes
2002: React by Erick Sermon
2002: Born to Reign by Will Smith
2002: Man vs. Machine by Xzibit
2003: Street Dreams by Fabolous
2004: Tical 0: The Prequel by Method Man
2004: Welcome Back by Mase
2005: Block Movement by B-Legit
2005: Cash on Delivery by Ray Cash
2005: Institutionalized by Ras Kass
2006: Everready (The Religion) by Tech N9ne
2006: Tha Blue Carpet Treatment by Snoop Dogg
2006: My Ghetto Report Card by E-40
2007: Ultimate Victory by Chamillionaire
2007: T.H.U.G.S. by Bone Thugs-n-Harmony
2008: Ego Trippin' by Snoop Dogg
2008: T.O.S: Terminate on Sight by G-Unit
2009: Custom Cars & Cycles by Triple C's
2009: Before I Self Destruct by 50 Cent
2010: Revenue Retrievin': Night Shift by E-40
2011: Doggumentary by Snoop Dogg
2012: The Block Brochure: Welcome to the Soil 1 by E-40
2012: The Block Brochure: Welcome to the Soil 2 by E-40
2012: The Block Brochure: Welcome to the Soil 3 by E-40
2012: Napalm by Xzibit
2012: History: Function Music by E-40 & Too $hort
2012: History: Mob Music by E-40 & Too $hort
2013: Demonstration by Tinie Tempah
2014: Sharp On All 4 Corners: Corner 1 by E-40
2014: Sharp On All 4 Corners: Corner 2 by E-40
2015: Mudface by Redman
2016: The D-Boy Diary: Book 1 by E-40
2016: The D-Boy Diary: Book 2 by E-40
2017: Neva Left by Snoop Dogg
2017: Trillionaire Thoughts by Droop-E
2019: Rick Rock Beats by Rick Rock
2019: Madden 20 by Snoop Dogg
2019: I Wanna Thank Me by Snoop Dogg
2019: Black Man In America by Redman
2020: Summer of Sam by Serial Killers
2020: Extinction Level Event 2: The Wrath of God by Busta Rhymes
2021: Blue Castle'' by Battle Locco

References 

Living people
Record producers from California
Year of birth missing (living people)
Musicians from Alabama
Place of birth missing (living people)
People from Fairfield, California
Musicians from the San Francisco Bay Area